Joliette Airport  is located  northwest of Joliette, Quebec, Canada.

See also
 Joliette/Saint-Thomas Aerodrome

References

Buildings and structures in Joliette
Registered aerodromes in Lanaudière